The 2009–10 West Virginia Mountaineers men's basketball team represented West Virginia University in the 2009-10 NCAA Division I men's basketball season. They were coached by Bob Huggins and played their home games at the WVU Coliseum.  The team captured the first Big East tournament championship in school history. They won the East Region to advance to the second Final Four in school history, where they lost in the national semi-finals to eventual National Champion Duke, 78–57.  The team finished #3 in the final Coaches Poll with a record of 31–7, setting the record for most wins in school history.

Preseason

Recruiting

Roster

2009–10 Schedule

|-
!colspan=12 style=| Exhibition

|-
!colspan=10 style=| Regular season

|-
!colspan=9 style=| Big East tournament

|-
!colspan=10 style=| NCAA tournament

References

West Virginia Mountaineers
West Virginia Mountaineers men's basketball seasons
West Virginia
NCAA Division I men's basketball tournament Final Four seasons
Mount
Mount